Fort MacKay/Albian Aerodrome  is located  east northeast of Fort McKay and approximately  southwest of Albian Village, Alberta, Canada in the Athabasca Oil Sands area. Albian Village has been built by Shell Canada to house workers at the Jackpine Mine. The runway routinely handles Boeing 737 flights bringing in contract workers to construct Jackpine Mine, in addition to a daily Shell Dornier commuter aircraft from Edmonton and Calgary.

Airlines and destinations

See also
Albian Sands

References

External links
Page about this airport on COPA's Places to Fly airport directory

Registered aerodromes in Alberta
Transport in the Regional Municipality of Wood Buffalo